Harriett Mary Morison Baldwin (born 2 May 1960) is a British Conservative Party politician serving as Member of Parliament (MP) for West Worcestershire since 2010. Baldwin was Minister of State for Africa and International Development between January 2018 and July 2019. In 2022, Baldwin was elected Chair of the Treasury Select Committee.

Prior to her parliamentary career, she worked for the investment bank JPMorgan Chase.

Early life and career
Harriett Mary Morison Eggleston was born on 2 May 1960 in Watford, Hertfordshire to Anthony Francis Eggleston and Jane Morison Buxton. Her father was a former headmaster of the private Felsted School in Essex and the Campion School in Athens. During his tenure as headmaster at Felsted School, he allowed the admission of girls to the sixth form in 1970. Her childhood was spent in Cyprus and in the village of Felsted. Her early education was at the Friends' School, Saffron Walden, and Marlborough College in Wiltshire (both independent schools).

Baldwin studied French and Russian at Lady Margaret Hall, Oxford. She also obtained an MBA from McGill University in Montreal, Canada.

Baldwin joined the investment bank JPMorgan Chase in 1986, becoming managing director and head of currency management at their London office in 1998. She later became a pension fund manager at the bank before leaving in 2008. She served as vice-chair of Social Investment Business between 2008 and 2012.

Parliamentary career
At the 2005 general election, Baldwin contested the Stockton North constituency. She came second to incumbent Labour Party MP Frank Cook.

Following the retirement of Michael Spicer at the 2010 general election, she was elected to the safe Conservative seat of West Worcestershire. During the coalition government headed by Prime Minister David Cameron, she was a member of the Work and Pensions Select Committee until she was appointed Parliamentary Private Secretary to the Minister of State for Employment Mark Hoban at the Department of Work and Pensions in 2012. Baldwin was also a member of the UK's delegation to the NATO Parliamentary Assembly.

In 2013, she attempted to claim a £50 donation to a local hospice as an expense. This was rejected by the Independent Parliamentary Standards Authority. From 2010 to 2018, Baldwin successfully claimed £1.1 million in expenses.

In February 2014, Baldwin became an assistant government whip and in the government reshuffle in July, she was promoted to the role of Government Whip, Lord Commissioner of HM Treasury.

Following the 2015 election, in which the Conservative Party won an overall majority, she was promoted to Economic Secretary to the Treasury with responsibility for financial services, known unofficially as the City Minister. Baldwin was also appointed as the Prime Minister's Trade Envoy to Russia. She supported the UK remaining within the EU in the 2016 membership referendum.

In July 2016, Baldwin was appointed as the Parliamentary Under-Secretary and the Minister for Defence Procurement at the Ministry of Defence as part of the Government reshuffle by new Prime Minister Theresa May.

Baldwin was Minister of State for Africa and International Development between January 2018 and July 2019. She voted for then Prime Minister Theresa May's Brexit withdrawal agreement. In the 2019 Conservative Party leadership election, Baldwin supported Jeremy Hunt.

Baldwin has been a member of the Treasury Select Committee since March 2020 and was elected its chair in 2022.

On 26 May 2020, she called on Prime Minister Boris Johnson's then chief advisor Dominic Cummings to resign, following an alleged breach of lockdown rules. Baldwin voted for the "second lockdown" in November 2020. She is a steering committee member of the lockdown-sceptic COVID Recovery Group, a group of Conservative MPs who opposed the UK government's December 2020 lockdown.

She supported Penny Mordaunt in the October 2022 Conservative Party leadership election.

Personal life
Harriet married James Stanley Baldwin in 2004; she has two stepdaughters and a son from a previous marriage.

References

External links

They walked the walk in finance, now they’re running for Parliament, Laura Dixon, Peter Stiff and Toby Miller, The Times, 12 January 2010

1960 births
Alumni of Lady Margaret Hall, Oxford
Female members of the Parliament of the United Kingdom for English constituencies
Conservative Party (UK) MPs for English constituencies
Living people
McGill University Faculty of Management alumni
People educated at Marlborough College
People from Watford
UK MPs 2010–2015
UK MPs 2015–2017
UK MPs 2017–2019
UK MPs 2019–present
People from Felsted
21st-century British women politicians
Economic Secretaries to the Treasury
21st-century English women
21st-century English people